Sanam Prasad Shetty is an Indian actress and model, who has worked predominantly in Tamil, Telugu and Malayalam films.

Career
Born to a Tulu father and a Telugu mother in Bangalore, Shetty became interested in fashion shows while studying computer engineering in college. In the mid-2000s, Shetty was initially recruited to model by fashion choreographer Prasad Bidapa and subsequently took part in the Miss Bangalore 2004 competition. Sanam later chose to pursue a career as a software engineer with companies including Tata Consultancy Services in 2006, and briefly moved to the United Kingdom to continue working in the area. During her time abroad, Sanam worked on amateur documentary films and became interested in acting opportunities. She was later re-introduced to Chennai's fashion scene by choreographer Ganesh Gurung and regularly modelled for brands in the city during the weekends, while working as a software engineer during the week. In 2010, Sanam, along with Arthi Venkatesh, were described by The New Indian Express as being among "the top models" in Chennai.

Sanam was first cast in the Malayalam film Cinema Company (2012), but ended up making her feature film debut through the Tamil science fiction film, Ambuli (2012), which garnered attention for being the first digital stereoscopic Tamil film. Set in the 1970s, Sanam portrayed a young college girl who becomes caught up in mysterious happenings in a village. The film opened to mixed reviews in February 2012 after a low-profile release at the box office. Sanam continued to receive acting offers and completed a series of low-profile films including the Tamil-Malayalam bilingual project Ravu (2013) by Ajit Ravi Pegasus, Maayai (2013) and Vilaasam (2014), all of which went unnoticed at the box office. A more high-profile film she featured in during the period was the Mammootty-starrer Daivathinte Swantham Cleetus (2014), where she portrayed a supporting role. Sanam was also set to make her debut in Telugu films through veteran director K. Raghavendra Rao's Intinta Anamayya, playing a "NRI rockstar with a very modern outlook". However, despite completing production, the film was never released. She had also signed on to play the lead role in a female-centric film by Aabavanan, where she would play a martial arts expert, though the film was later dropped.

In the mid-2010s, Sanam continued to appear in small budget films in the four South Indian film industries. Her notable Tamil films during the period included the action film Katham Katham (2015), the comedy drama Vellaiya Irukiravan Poi Solla Maatan (2015) and the slasher film Sadhuram 2 (2016). Meanwhile, proposed roles in higher profile film such as Susi Ganesan's Thiruttu Payale 2 (2015) did not materialise. In Telugu films, Sanam portrayed a small role alongside Mahesh Babu in Srimanthudu (2015), and lead roles in the comedy film Singam 123 (2015) and Premikudu (2016). Sanam featured in her first Kannada film, Atharva (2018), appearing alongside debutant Pavan Teja. In 2017, she launched her first film as a producer, Magie, the tale of a girl brought up in Meghalaya. However, the project was later stalled following her fallout with the lead actor Tharshan.

In 2019, Sanam was belatedly crowned as the winner of the Miss South India 2016 beauty pageant, after the organiser opted to dethrone Meera Mithun owing to fraudulent activities. Sanam participated in the reality television show, Bigg Boss Tamil hosted by Kamal Haasan in 2020. She received positive reviews from audiences for her stint on the show, with viewers praising her "straight-forward answers and bold questioning" of issues among contestants.

Personal life
Sanam Shetty became engaged to actor Tharshan Thiyagarajah in May 2019, with the wedding planned for June 2019. Tharshan's involvement in the 2019 series of Bigg Boss Tamil later meant that the ceremony was postponed, before the pair cancelled the engagement in late 2019. Sanam later filed a police complaint against Tharshan for his misuse of her funds.

Filmography

References

External links
 

Living people
Place of birth missing (living people)
21st-century Indian actresses
Actresses from Bangalore
Actresses in Kannada cinema
Actresses in Malayalam cinema
Actresses in Tamil cinema
Actresses in Telugu cinema
Bigg Boss (Tamil TV series) contestants
Indian film actresses
Year of birth missing (living people)